Stangskyting, literally Stang-shooting named after Colonel Georg Stang (1858–1907), is a practical rifle competition popular in Norway where dueling shooters have two periods of 25 seconds to get as many hits as possible on a target at an unknown distance, with an unlimited number of rounds. Competitions in Norway are arranged by Det frivillige Skyttervesen.

Procedure 
The shooting position is prone with the rifle loaded, safety catch applied and the butt of the stock touching the ground. At the command "Ready!" the rifle is put to the shoulder and the safety catch disengaged. Five seconds later the "Fire!" command is given. The targets used is Småen placed somewhere between 125–175 meters, and a 1/4 target ("quarter torso") placed somewhere between 200–250 meters.

 The Småen target is an oblong, tall and narrow shape which measures 250 mm tall and 305 mm wide. When placed at the minimum distance of 125 meters Småen measures to ca. 2.4 mrad wide and 2 mrad tall, and when placed at the maximum distance of 175 meters it corresponds to ca. 1.7 mrad wide and 1.4 mrad tall.

 The 1/4 target is a triangular shape which measures 330 mm wide and 490 mm tall. When placed at the minimum distance of 200 meters the 1/4 target corresponds to ca. 1.7 mrad wide and 2.5 mrad tall, and when placed at the maximum distance of 250 meters it corresponds to ca. 1.3 mrad wide and 2 mrad tall.

Approved rifles 
Used by civilian shooters:
 Krag–Jørgensen (in Stang shooting since 1912, still somewhat popular)
 Mauser M67 (since the 1960s)
 SIG Sauer 200 STR (since 1990)

Used by military personnel:
 AG-3 (until 2021)
 HK416 (since 2018)

Danish variant 
A Danish variant very similar to stangskyting called hurtigskydning (literally speed shooting) is arranged by Danske Gymnastik- & Idrætsforeninger (DGI). 10-ring bullseye targets at 200 m must be engaged with as many rounds as possible during 25 seconds, only scoring hits in the black area.

See also 
 Field rapid shooting, another Scandinavian practical rifle competition
 Mad minute, a British speed shooting exercise

References 

Shooting sports